Albert Wright (24 September 1875 – 23 December 1938) was an Australian cricketer. He played in thirty first-class matches for South Australia between 1905 and 1921.

See also
 List of South Australian representative cricketers

References

External links
 

1875 births
1938 deaths
Australian cricketers
South Australia cricketers
Cricketers from Adelaide